Tyrone Prince (born 12 March 1968) in Saint Vincent and the Grenadines) is a Saint Vincent and the Grenadines international footballer, who played in midfield.

Biography

National team 
Tyrone Prince played for the Saint Vincent and the Grenadines national football team between 1992 and 2005.

He took part in the 1996 Gold Cup in the United States. In the competition, he played one match, against Guatemala.

He also took part in 1994 FIFA World Cup qualification, 1998 FIFA World Cup qualification, and 2006 FIFA World Cup qualification

References 

1968 births
Living people
Saint Vincent and the Grenadines international footballers
Saint Vincent and the Grenadines footballers
Association football midfielders